Wanxiang Group Corporation is a Chinese multinational conglomerate, headquartered in Hangzhou, Zhejiang province, China.  Its automotive components subsidiary (Wangxiang Qiaochao) is the largest China-based automotive components company measured by revenues. The company was founded in 1969 by Lu Guanqiu.

Subsidiaries

Wangxiang Qianchao Co., Ltd. 
Wangxiang Qiaochao Co., Ltd. is a public company listed on Shenzhen Stock Exchange (Symbol 000559).

A123 Systems, LLC

On October 16, 2012, A123 Systems had filed for bankruptcy protection under Chapter 11, Title 11, United States Code. Wanxiang won an auction for the bankrupt United States-based lithium-ion battery maker in December 2012 for a closing price of US$256.6 million.
A123 Systems had more than 3000 employees as of that date.

Karma Automotive

Wanxiang received U.S. bankruptcy court approval on February 18, 2014, to buy the assets of Fisker Automotive, a manufacturer of plug-in hybrid sports cars which was declared bankrupt in November 2013. Wanxiang's American subsidiary won a three-day auction with a bid of 149.2 million. Bidding had started at 55 million. The company said in court papers that it could restart production in the coming months, estimating that it would sell more than 1,000 Fisker Karma cars in the first 18 months in the U.S. and 500 in Europe. The automotive company was renamed to Karma Automotive, and their car was renamed Revero.

SAIC Wanxiang New Energy Coach Co., Ltd.
SAIC Motor Corporation and Wanxiang Group have set up a 49%-51% joint venture, known as SAIC Wanxiang New Energy Coach Co., Ltd. and acquired the license to manufacture vehicles in July 2015. The joint-venture plans to produce its first new alternative fueled coach after granted with license plates by Chinese authorities after a few years of operation.

See also

Automotive industry in China

References

External links
 

Auto parts suppliers of China
Auto parts suppliers of the United States
Electric vehicle manufacturers of China
Multinational companies headquartered in China
Manufacturing companies based in Hangzhou
Chinese companies established in 1969
Automotive companies established in 1969
Chinese brands
Publicly traded companies of China